Hoodia flava is a succulent native to the Cape Province in South Africa and to Namibia. It has a unique pattern of distribution, growing inside bushes or on gravelly slopes and hills. It is commonly known as ghaap or yellow-flowered ghaap in the Afrikaans language.

Description
Leafless and branchless, H. flava grows as cylindrical green stems up to 6 inches in height and 2 inches in diameter, with 20-30 longitudinal ribs of mammillae, each one featuring a thin, brown spine on its crest. Yellow flowers appear in winter on the youngest parts of the plants near the top.

Cultivation
This plant should be watered during its growing season and then sparsely otherwise.

References

flava
Flora of Southern Africa
Taxa named by N. E. Brown